Azad Dam is an embankment dam on the Gura River,  west of Sanandaj in Kordestan province, Iran. It is situated in Kurdistan Province and its construction is part of a water management plan for Kurdistan Province.

As the water table of these towns have gone down by over   due to the excessive use of underground water for crop cultivation, the construction of this dam will help to conserve the underground water sources of the area. One village had to be relocated due to construction of the dam and another new village has been built near the body of the dam. It is estimated that Azad dam will yearly produce approximately 95 GWh of electricity. The dam was operational in 2014.

See also

List of power stations in Iran

References

Dams completed in 2014
Energy infrastructure completed in 2013
Hydroelectric power stations in Iran
Pumped-storage hydroelectric power stations in Iran
Dams in Kurdistan Province
Earth-filled dams